Cocula is a town in the Mexican state of Guerrero.
It is the municipal seat for Cocula Municipality, Guerrero.

References

See also
Municipalities of Guerrero

Populated places in Guerrero